Tohumluk Creek is one of two main tributaries of the Yağlıdere stream in the Kurtbeli highlands of the Alucra district in Giresun Province, Turkey.

References 

Giresun
Rivers of Turkey
Rivers of Giresun Province